Kunduchi is an administrative ward in the Kinondoni district of the Dar es Salaam Region of Tanzania. According to the 2012 census, the ward has a total population of 75,016. Kunduchi, near its long beach, has a number of hotels including Kunduchi Beach Hotel, Wet' n Wild, Ununio beach with active night life.

Local people depend on sea fishing: the coastline attracts fish to be near the shore, so fishermen don't need to go far to catch fish.

References

Kinondoni District
Wards of Dar es Salaam Region